Sobiaquirú is an Embera village in Darién Province, Panama.  It is located along the Tuira River upstream of the village of Boca de Cupe, and within the corregimiento of that same name.  It is not served by any paved roads.   It is about a nine hour boat ride from Yaviza.

References

Populated places in Darién Province
Road-inaccessible communities of Panama